Umm Hiram bint Milhan (Aunt Sultan), was the aunt and one of the companions of the Islamic prophet Muhammad. She was also one of the Ansar of Medina.

Life 
She was the sister of Umm Sulaim and their house was often visited by Muhammad. Her two brothers, Haram bin Milhan and Sulaim bin Milhan participated in the Battle of Badr and Uhud. She was married to another companion of Muhammad, 'Ubadah ibn al-Samit. She was also aunt of Anas bin Malik, Muhammad's servant.
'Ubadah was one of the first Ansari men to take part in the Pledge of Aqabah.

Tomb of Umm Haram
The tomb of Umm Haram is in Larnaca, Cyprus and a mosque is built beside it. The mosque is known as Hala Sultan Tekke.

See also

References 

Women companions of the Prophet
7th-century Arabs